Líneas Aéreas Privadas Argentinas, more commonly known by the acronym LAPA (and known as ARG Argentina Línea Privada and AIRG from 2001 to 2002), was an airline based in Buenos Aires, Argentina. At its heyday, the carrier operated international services to the United States and Uruguay, as well as an extensive domestic network within Argentina. Additionally, the company also operated charter services. Domestic and regional flights were operated from downtown's Aeroparque Jorge Newbery, whereas an international service to Atlanta was operated from Ministro Pistarini International Airport. LAPA was the first carrier to break a monopolistic market controlled by Aerolíneas Argentinas and its sister company Austral Líneas Aéreas, offering competitive prices.

It ceased operations in April 2003.

History 
The airline was formed in 1977, initially aimed at providing internal services within the Buenos Aires Province. In May 1978, it was authorised to operate charter services to cities in the Americas, and scheduled services began the following year. By , the major shareholder of the company was Claudio Zichy-Thyssen; the fleet comprised three YS-11As and a Piper Cheyenne that worked on a domestic passenger and cargo network serving Concordia, Ezeiza Airport, Gualeguaychu, La Plata, Necochea, Olavarria, Parana, Pehuajo, San Nicolas and Tres Arroyos. Gustavo Deutsch acquired the company in 1984, when it had a network consisting of two domestic routes served with a single propeller aircraft.

In January 1987, the airline became the first South American operator of the Saab 340. The carrier started a period of major growth in 1993 when it gained permissions to fly to Bariloche, Córdoba, Iguazú and Mar del Plata. A year later, the route network included 17 destinations, served with three aircraft. At , LAPA had 60 employees; the fleet consisted of one Beech B-58 Baron, one Beech King Air 500, two Boeing 737s and two Saab 340s that worked on routes to Bariloche, Colonia, Córdoba, Iguazú, Mar del Plata, Mendoza, Montevideo and Villa Gessel. LAPA became a Boeing 757 operator in September 1995 when it took possession of its first aircraft of the type. By late 1996, LAPA had a 30% of domestic market share.

Change of ownership and name 

On 27 September 2001 the airline changed its name to ARG Argentina Línea Privada following the acquisition of the company by Eduardo Eurnekian. Aircraft were painted in a new livery, displaying the acronym ARG on both sides of the fuselage. This situation prompted an issue with the airline's name, as ARG is the ICAO airline code for Aerolíneas Argentinas. In mid-2002 the name of the airline was changed to AIRG. Bolivian airline AeroSur and four Argentine investors acquired the airline on 29 August 2002, and the original name LAPA was restored.

Downfall and ceased operations 
The company filed for bankruptcy protection in May 2001, and ceased operations in April 2003, after three of its five aircraft were repossessed by the lessors.

Destinations 
The airline had its heyday following the deregulation of the Argentine air market in 1994; it operated an extensive domestic network, as well as international services to Atlanta, Montevideo and Punta del Este.

The list of destinations served at the time of closure in 2003 were Buenos Aires, Comodoro Rivadavia, Córdoba, El Calafate, Florianópolis, Iguazú, Mendoza, Puerto Madryn, Puerto Montt, Salta, San Carlos de Bariloche, San Juan, San Luis, Santa Cruz de la Sierra, Santiago de Chile, São Paulo, Trelew, Tucumán, and Ushuaia. During the course of its history, LAPA served the following destinations:

Fleet 
Prior to its bankruptcy in April 2003, the most modern aircraft in the fleet, such as the brand-new Boeing 737-700s, Boeing 757-200s, as well as a single Boeing 767-300ER the company flew the Buenos Aires–Atlanta route with, were gradually returned to their lessors throughout 2001 and 2002, as their leases proved too expensive. When LAPA ceased operations in April 2003, only three of its remaining five Boeing 737-200 Advanced were operational.

The company operated the following aircraft throughout its history:

BAC 1-11 400
Boeing 737-200
Boeing 737-200 Advanced
Boeing 737-200C
Boeing 737-700
Boeing 757-200
Boeing 767-300ER
Embraer EMB 110 Bandeirante
Piper Cheyenne
Piper Cheyenne II
Saab 340
Short 330
YS-11A-300

Accidents and incidents 

31 August 1999: Flight 3142, a Boeing 737-200C, registration LV-WRZ, that operated a scheduled Buenos Aires–Córdoba passenger service, crashed during takeoff from Aeroparque Jorge Newbery after it failed to get airborne. Out of 103 occupants of the plane, 63 died in the accident, plus two ground casualties. The accident remains the third deadliest one in the Argentine aviation history, behind Aerolíneas Argentinas Flight 644 and Austral Líneas Aéreas Flight 2553.

See also 

List of airlines of Argentina
List of defunct airlines of South America
Transport in Argentina

References

External links 

 LAPA Former Fleet Detail.

Defunct airlines of Argentina
Airlines established in 1977
Airlines disestablished in 2003
2003 disestablishments in Argentina
Argentine companies established in 1977